Macarena Mix is the title of a compilation album released on June 27, 1995. It includes covers from popular dance songs of the 1990s and three versions of the monumental hit "Macarena" by Los del Río. This album peaked at number one in the Billboard Top Latin Albums chart for four non-consecutive weeks in 1996.

Track listing
This track listing from Billboard.

Personnel
This information from AllMusic.
Jesus Bola – arranger, musical direction
Manuel Soler – arranger, musical direction
Los del Río – performer
Los Manolos – performer
Sandalo – performer

Chart performance

See also
List of number-one Billboard Top Latin Albums from the 1990s
List of number-one Billboard Latin Pop Albums from the 1990s

References

1995 compilation albums
Spanish-language albums
Los del Río albums
Latin pop compilation albums
Dance-pop compilation albums